The 2018 Saskatchewan Roughriders season was the 61st season for the team in the Canadian Football League. It was the club's 109th year overall, and its 103rd season of play. The Roughriders improved upon their 10–8 record from 2017 with a 12–6 record and qualified for the playoffs for the second consecutive year. The team hosted the first ever playoff game at the new Mosaic Stadium, but lost to the Winnipeg Blue Bombers in the West Semi-Final. This was the third season under head coach and general manager Chris Jones.

The club held their training camp at Griffiths Stadium in Saskatoon, for the sixth consecutive season, with the main camp beginning on May 20.

The Roughriders became the first team to defeat the Calgary Stampeders in the 2018 regular season with a 40–27 win on August 19. At the time, they were also the only team to have lost to the Montreal Alouettes in the regular season, thus becoming the first team to be both the only team to beat a previously undefeated opponent and the only one to lose to a different opponent with a previously winless record after playing eight games of a professional football season.

Offseason
On December 8, 2017, the Roughriders released Beau Landry, Zach Minter, Ivan Brown and Cameron Ontko. On December 20, 2017, it was announced the Roughriders re-signed Canadian quarterback Brandon Bridge, who split starting duties with Kevin Glenn during the 2017 season. The next day, the Roughriders would re-sign veteran defensive back Jovon Johnson and offensive lineman Thaddeus Coleman. On December 27, 2017, the Roughriders re-signed kick returner and the team's top rookie Christion Jones. Two days later, they would re-sign defensive back Crezdon Butler.

On January 3, 2018, the Roughriders acquired quarterback Zach Collaros from the Hamilton Tiger Cats. The next day, the Roughriders released veteran quarterback Kevin Glenn. On January 19, 2018, the Roughriders signed Collaros to a restructured contract for 2018. On January 22, 2018, the Roughriders re-signed star receiver Duron Carter to a one-year contract extension. On January 31, 2018, the Roughriders released linebacker Jeff Knox to pursue an opportunity in the National Football League. On February 1, 2018, the Roughriders released running backs Kienan LaFrance and Shakir Bell. The next day, the Roughriders acquired defensive lineman Charleston Hughes from the Hamilton Tiger Cats in exchange for quarterback Vernon Adams. On February 3, the Roughriders released Kacy Rodgers II so he could pursue an NFL opportunity with the New York Jets. The team also released international defensive back Erick Dargan.

On February 13, 2018, the first day of CFL free agency, the Roughriders re-signed national offensive lineman Dan Clark and fullback Spencer Moore. The team signed national defensive lineman Zack Evans. They also released international linebacker Glenn Love and offensive lineman Derek Dennis, who was their top free agent signing from 2017. The next day, the Roughriders officially announced the signing of national running back Jerome Messam and national linebacker Sam Hurl, both of whom had played for the team previously.

On February 15, 2018, the Roughriders signed international offensive lineman Travis Bond and national defensive back Adam Laurensse, but released their top defensive player from 2017 in national linebacker Henoc Muamba. On February 19, the Roughriders announced the signing of national receiver Jake Harty. The next day, the team announced international defensive end Charleston Hughes had signed an extension through 2019.

On February 22, 2018, the Roughriders re-signed international offensive lineman Jarvis Harrison, receiver TJ Thorpe, offensive lineman Terran Vaughn and defensive back Melvin White. They also signed international receivers Shaq Evans and Jacoby Ford.

CFL draft
The 2018 CFL Draft took place on May 3, 2018. The Roughriders had five selections in the eight-round draft.

Preseason

Regular season

Standings

Schedule 
As the province of Saskatchewan does not observe Daylight Saving Time, all times quoted here (in CST) are the same as Mountain Daylight Time.

Post-season

Schedule

Team

Roster

Coaching staff

References

Saskatchewan Roughriders seasons
2018 Canadian Football League season by team
2018 in Saskatchewan